Estadio Juan Ramón Brevé Vargas is a soccer venue in Juticalpa, Olancho, Honduras. It is the headquarters of Juticalpa F.C. and Olancho FC, both of the Honduran Liga Nacional de Ascenso. It was inaugurated in July 2015.

First game
The first official game was played on Sunday 9 August 2015 between hosts Juticalpa F.C. and Real C.D. España for the game week two of the 2015–16 Honduran Liga Nacional season.  The match ended with a 2–0 victory for the home team.  The first official goal was scored by Real España's defender Wilfredo Barahona in his own net.  It was also Juticalpa's first ever game in first division.

First hat-trick
On 18 August 2016, Juticalpa F.C.'s midfielder Carlos Lanza became the first player to score a hat-trick at Estadio Juan Ramón Brevé Vargas in the 3–1 home team's victory over C.D. Social Sol.

References

Juan Ramon Breve Vargas